B-Movie (also known as Invasion from Beyond in North America) is a PlayStation game released in 1998, developed by King of the Jungle and published by GT Interactive.

Plot
This game is inspired by the science fiction B-movies during the 1950s decade. Martians have arrived at the Earth in these unidentified flying objects to launch an alien invasion, alien conspiracy, UFO conspiracy, alien abduction, UFO sighting, paranormal activity, mass murder, killing spree, insurgency, suicide bombings, violent crimes, crimes against humanity, bullying, duress, abuse, genocide, homicides, arsons, hate crimes, and terrorism as players are Earth's final hope. So players choose these jet fighters, and with these jetfighters, they fight back at these alien invaders and save others from this invasion, insurgence, and terror attack.

Reception

The game received mixed reviews according to the review aggregation website GameRankings.

GameSpot said, "what King of the Jungle has achieved here is impressive and bodes well for future efforts from this fledgling collection of industry veterans. [...] Invasion From Beyond arrives like a bolt out of the blue and adds an exciting new take on the 'vehicular combat' genre."

On the other hand, Next Generation said, "Don't let the cool retro box art fool you. This game deserves to be passed on, even when it's staring up from the bottom of the bargain bin."

References

External links
 

1998 video games
Action video games
Alien invasions in video games
GT Interactive games
King of the Jungle games
PlayStation (console) games
PlayStation (console)-only games
Single-player video games
Video games about extraterrestrial life
Video games developed in the United Kingdom